Gardno is a lake in the Słowińskie Lakeland in Pomeranian Voivodship, Poland. It is the part of Słowiński National Park. It is 6.8 km long and 4.7 km wide. Maximum depth is 2.6 m.

External links 
https://web.archive.org/web/20070310230732/http://www.biol.uni.wroc.pl/obuwr/archiwum/9/image/298.jpg
https://web.archive.org/web/20070310230750/http://www.biol.uni.wroc.pl/obuwr/archiwum/9/image/299.jpg

Lakes of Poland
Lakes of Pomeranian Voivodeship